Katharine Sarah Gallego (née Widland, born October 21, 1981) is an American politician serving as the 62nd mayor of Phoenix, Arizona since 2019. A member of the Democratic Party, she previously served on the Phoenix City Council from 2014 to 2018.

Early life and education
Gallego grew up in Albuquerque, New Mexico. Her parents are attorneys who moved to Albuquerque from Chicago after the 1979 Chicago blizzard. She grew up with asthma, which made air quality important to her.

Gallego graduated from Albuquerque Academy, where she served as student body vice president. She earned a bachelor's degree in environmental studies from Harvard College and a Master of Business Administration from the Wharton School of the University of Pennsylvania.

Political career
Gallego worked for the Arizona Democratic Party, the Arizona Office of Tourism, as well as on economic development and strategic planning for the Salt River Project.  On November 5, 2013, Gallego was elected to the Phoenix City Council for the 8th district; she was reelected in 2017. With Greg Stanton, the Mayor of Phoenix, running for the United States House of Representatives in the 2018 elections, Gallego announced she would run in a special election to succeed him. She resigned from the city council effective August 7, 2018.

First and second term election results 
The city of Phoenix has nonpartisan mayoral elections. In the 2018 special election, Kate Gallego and Daniel Valenzuela advanced to a runoff in November of 2018. They defeated Moses Sanchez and Nicholas Sarwark. Although the election was nonpartisan, both candidates were Democrats. Previously on the city council, they had voted similarly. Kate Gallego defeated Daniel Valenzuela in the special general runoff election for the mayor of Phoenix in 2019. She received 58.6% of votes. She assumed office on March 21, 2019. Gallego became the first woman elected to the office in more than three decades. She is only the second female mayor in Phoenix and one of the youngest big city mayors in the United States. She was backed by progressives, labor unions, the Arizona Republic editorial board, and liberal advocacy organizations. Examples of these include Emily's List, Sierra Club, and the Planned Parenthood Advocates of Arizona.

In 2020 Kate Gallego ran for reelection. In November 2020, she was returned to office with the highest number of votes cast in a mayoral candidate in Phoenix. Merissa Hamilton, a Libertarian write in candidate, was Gallego's closest opponent. Hamilton received 26.29% of votes. Gallego won the election receiving 60.7% of the votes.

Personal life
Gallego is Jewish, celebrating her bat mitzvah in Albuquerque.

While attending Harvard, Kate met Ruben Gallego at a charity auction following the September 11 attacks. They moved to Phoenix in 2004, and married in 2010. The couple announced their divorce in 2016, prior to the birth of their child, Michael.

Climate change 
Under Gallego's leadership, Phoenix has taken important steps to counter the urban heat island effects which are aggravated by climate change.  Increasing temperatures in the Phoenix area are projected to cost billions of dollars per year. Among the steps being taken are the creation of "cool corridors" through the planting of desert-adapted trees, and the use of lighter-colored sidewalks and streets, particularly in areas with high pedestrian traffic and little shade.  Where to plant the trees is determined in part based on “tree equity”. The city uses an interactive tool from the nonprofit American Forests, that grades shade in neighborhoods based on satellite images. Phoenix has also opened one of the first city heat mitigation offices in the United States. Directed by David Hondula, it will support climate mitigation in Phoenix and share strategies  with individuals and cities worldwide.

Police reform 
The police department of Phoenix recorded shooting 44 people in 2018, spurring a reassessment from the community on police accountability. In 2020, Mayor Kate Gallego suggested a plan for a citizens review board that would balance the police department interests and community interests. City councilman Carlos Garcia, who ran on further police accountability, created a plan focused on empowering a citizens review board from input of the community and groups such as Puente Human Rights and Poder in Action. The city council passed Garcia's model for a review board when Mayor Kate Gallego and vice mayor Betty Guardados switched their vote from Gallego's model to the Garcia model 5-4 vote. 

Established in 2021 the citizen review board is part of a new city department named Office of Accountability and Transparency (OAT). The board has powers to investigate police misconduct, in addition to any police department investigation. The office has a system for anonymous tips and can investigate information on the misconduct by police. A community board of citizens and can investigate alongside police investigations of misconduct. The city manager may also start investigations of any police misconduct events. On March 15 of every year the Office of Accountability and Transparency (OAT) releases an annual report on all investigations the department has undergone previously.

A Department of Justice investigation was initiated in  August 2021 looking into if the police used excessive force on protestors and sweeping of homeless people and their property. The investigation plans to look at current police practices and its handling of the disabled. Mayor Kate Gallego tweeted about the event welcoming the investigation and that police reform was an important issue when she took office.

Phoenix budget 
The budget of Phoenix Arizona can be seen through FundPHX, an online budget software that allows citizens to see how the 2022-2023 $1.4 billion-dollar general fund budget is spent. As per the city of Phoenix charter, the city budget must be balanced. In addition, anyone can create a budget with the tool and submit their policy suggestion to the city council. The program is said to allow for more transparency and citizen input in the budgeting process. An individual's suggested budget can also be submitted to the office of Budget and Research to give the information to the city council.

See also
List of mayors of the 50 largest cities in the United States

References

External links

Official profile

21st-century American politicians
21st-century American women politicians
Arizona city council members
Jewish mayors of places in the United States
Harvard College alumni
Living people
Mayors of Phoenix, Arizona
Jewish American people in Arizona politics
Politicians from Albuquerque, New Mexico
Wharton School of the University of Pennsylvania alumni
Women city councillors in Arizona
Women mayors of places in Arizona
Arizona Democrats
21st-century American Jews
1981 births